Cunts With Roses is an EP by Shit and Shine, released on 7 June 2007 by Noisestar Music.

Track listing

Personnel
Adapted from the Cunts With Roses liner notes.
Shit and Shine
 Craig Clouse – vocals, instruments

Release history

References

External links 
 

2007 EPs
Shit and Shine albums